Park Ri-ki (born July 18, 1992, in Osaka) is a Korean football player. He currently plays for Kochi United SC of the Shikoku Soccer League.

Club statistics
Updated to 23 February 2018.

References

External links
Profile at FC Ryukyu

1992 births
Living people
Association football people from Osaka Prefecture
South Korean footballers
J3 League players
FC Ryukyu players
Association football midfielders